Burquitlam is a portmanteau of Burnaby and Coquitlam, two cities in British Columbia, Canada.

It can refer to:
Burquitlam, British Columbia
Burquitlam Station, part of the Millennium Line
Burquitlam (electoral district), former provincial electoral district